Simran Natekar is an Indian actress. She works in the Bollywood film and TV industry. Her career began with advertisements and she has over 150 Advertisements to her credit. Her first TV serial was Bandhan Saat Janmo Ka on Colors and her first major feature film was in Yash Raj Films' Daawat-e-ishq. She starred in Best of Luck Laalu. She played a supporting role in Serial Balika Vadhu and Laado 2.

Early life 
She was born in Mumbai on 12 December 1997.

Career 
She started acting at age 6 as a young girl in a No Smoking Ad awareness campaign, which made her popular in many countries. She then continued doing television ads and print shoots. She also played Milli in girliyapa's girls hostel series on youtube in 2018

Her picture appears on Complan box. She is known for public awareness posters for the Mumbai Metro construction that appeared in Mumbai for almost 3 years while the Metro was laid out.

In 2011 she got a role in a serial for Star Plus named Ek Hazaaron Mein Meri Behna Hai in which she played the role of young Jeevika on Colors. She also did a cameo in The Suite Life of Karan & Kabir on Disney Channel as Shahana

In 2012, she appeared in the serial Tota Weds Maina.In 2013, she did the role of young Seeta in Devon ke Dev Mahadev and as Ruhi in Khauff on Life Ok.

Her movie Daawat-e-ishq was produced by Yash Raj films where she played Fareeda as Aditya Roy Kapoor's sister.

She has cameo's in Hatim, Krish3 and Dishkiyaoon and serials like Oye jassie ( as Minnie) and Palak Pe Jhalak for Disney .

In 2015, she played Pooja in Balika Vadhu and in 2016 she was selected for the role of Tanu In Ek Rishta Saajhedari Ka for Sony.

In 2017, Simran did Qaidi Band, Chakki and a lead role in Best of Luck Laalu (Gujarati film).

She also played Shivani in Pehredar Piya Ki during the same year.

Filmography

Television

Films

References

External links
 

1997 births
Living people
Actresses from Mumbai